Events from the year 1839 in Germany

Incumbents
 Kingdom of Prussia 
 Monarch – Frederick William III of Prussia (16 November 1797 – 7 June 1840)
 Kingdom of Bavaria
 Monarch - Ludwig I (1825–1848)
 Prime Minister – Karl von Abel (1837–1847)
 Kingdom of Saxony
 Frederick Augustus (1836–1854)
 Kingdom of Hanover– Ernest Augustus (1837–1851)
 Kingdom of Württemberg – William (1816–1864)

Events 

April 7- The first long-distance railway opened Leipzig-Dresden railway.
April 19- The Duchy of Limburg created in 1839 from parts of the Dutch Province of Limburg as a result of the Treaty of London and part of German Confederation.
April 19- Britain, Prussia, France and the Netherlands agree to the Treaty of London that guaranteed the neutrality of Belgium.

Births 
 January 4 - Carl Humann, German archaeologist (d. 1896)
 April 3 – Karl, Freiherr von Prel, German philosopher (d. 1899) 
July 12 - Jean Baptiste Holzmayer, German archaeologist (d. 1890)
 July 17- Friedrich Gernsheim (1839–1916), German composer, conductor and pianist.
 October 2 – Hans Thoma, German painter (died 1924)
 November 20 – Christian Wilberg, German painter (d. 1882)

Deaths 

January 6 -Princess Marie of Orléans, Duchess of Wurtenberg (b. 1813)
 January 12 – Joseph Anton Koch, Austrian painter of the German Romantic movement (born 1768) March 20 – Caspar Voght, German businessman (b. 1752)
 August 3 – Dorothea von Schlegel, German novelist and translator (born 1764)
 September 4 – Hermann Olshausen, German theologian (born 1796)

 September 29 – Friedrich Mohs, German geologist, mineralogist (b. 1773)

References

Bibliography

Years of the 19th century in Germany
Germany
Germany